DnaJ homolog subfamily C member 10 is a protein that in humans is encoded by the DNAJC10 gene.

References

Further reading

External links 
 PDBe-KB provides an overview of all the structure information available in the PDB for Mouse DnaJ homolog subfamily C member 10  (DNAJC10)

Heat shock proteins
Endoplasmic reticulum resident proteins